David Hidalgo Jr. (born August 30, 1984) is an American drummer who plays in the punk rock band Social Distortion.

Early life, family and education

He is the son of David Hidalgo, guitarist and singer of Los Lobos. The younger David began playing drums at age four.

Career
Hidalgo decided to become a career musician at age 20. He began playing with Suicidal Tendencies in 2002 until about 2007. He also played drums for The Bronx/Mariachi El Bronx (beginning in 2015 on a tour and later in 2016 as a member) as well as its side project The Drips and the hardcore punk band Bullet Treatment with a variety of lineups that also included members of Rise Against, The Bronx, Cancer Bats, Anti-Flag and others. 

Joining Social Distortion in 2010, he replaced former drummer Scott Reeder, who had been busy with his main project Fu Manchu. David also toured with Brody Dalle in her Spinnerette and self-titled projects. He has recorded and toured with Chuck Ragan and Dave Hause. He also recorded on a Greg Graffin solo album.

Instruments and equipment
Hidalgo uses and endorses:
Ludwig drums
Zildjian cymbals
Remo drumheads
Vater percussion and drumsticks

References

External links
Official website
David Hidalgo Jr. on Instagram
David Hidalgo Jr. on Twitter
Social Distortion
The Bronxxx

Living people
American rock drummers
American musicians of Mexican descent
Hispanic and Latino American musicians
Social Distortion members
1984 births
Spinnerette members
21st-century American drummers